Forever Eden is an American reality television series broadcast by the Fox Broadcasting Company (Fox). The series premiered on March 1, 2004, and it concluded on April 9, 2004. The contestants in the series could live in a resort not for weeks or months, but for years. It was hosted by Ruth England. In the end, contestants Shawna and Wallace won a combined total of $260,000. Brooke and Adam were runners-up.

The show was pulled after seven episodes, leaving eighteen episodes unaired. The remaining episodes were eventually screened in the United States on Fox Reality.

Production
The series was filmed in Jamaica at a cost of $750,000 per episode.

Episodes

References

External links
  at the Wayback Machine
 

American dating and relationship reality television series
Fox Broadcasting Company original programming
2004 American television series debuts
2004 American television series endings